Fulfillment: Winning and Losing in One-Click America is a 2021 book by Alec MacGillis that examines Amazon. The book has eleven "positive" reviews, four "rave" reviews, and two "mixed" reviews, according to review aggregator Book Marks.

References

2021 non-fiction books
English-language books
Farrar, Straus and Giroux books
Amazon (company)